Damien Jack Magnifico (born May 24, 1991) is an American former professional baseball pitcher. He played in Major League Baseball (MLB) for the Los Angeles Angels and the Milwaukee Brewers.

Career
Magnifico was drafted by the New York Mets in the fifth round of the 2009 Major League Baseball Draft out of North Mesquite High School in Mesquite, Texas. He did not sign with the Mets and attended Howard College to play college baseball. Prior to the 2012 season, he transferred to the University of Oklahoma, where he played for the Oklahoma Sooners.

Milwaukee Brewers
After one year at Oklahoma, Magnifico was drafted by the Milwaukee Brewers in the fifth round of the 2012 Major League Baseball Draft. He signed with the Brewers and made his professional debut with the Helena Brewers. He spent 2013 with the Wisconsin Timber Rattlers and Brevard County Manatees, 2014 with Brevard County and 2015 with the Biloxi Shuckers. The Brewers added him to their 40-man roster after the season.

Magnifico was promoted to the major leagues on August 16 and made his debut that day.

Baltimore Orioles
Magnifico was traded to the Baltimore Orioles on April 13, 2017. He was designated for assignment on May 2.

Los Angeles Angels
On May 6, he was traded to the Los Angeles Angels for minor leaguer Jordan Kipper. On June 3, 2017, Magnifico was called up and made his Angels debut. The Angels outrighted him to the minor leagues in August.

Pittsburgh Pirates
The Pittsburgh Pirates selected Magnifico from the Angels in the minor league phase of the Rule 5 draft after the 2017 season. He was invited to Spring Training for the 2018 season but did not make the team and elected free agency after the season on November 2, 2018.

Arizona Diamondbacks
On January 18, 2019, Magnifico signed a minor league deal with the Arizona Diamondbacks. Magnifico was released by the Diamondbacks organization on May 22, 2020.

On April 1, 2021, Magnifico announced his retirement from professional baseball via Twitter.

References

External links

Oklahoma Sooners bio

1991 births
Living people
Baseball players from Dallas
Major League Baseball pitchers
Milwaukee Brewers players
Los Angeles Angels players
Howard Hawks baseball players
Oklahoma Sooners baseball players
Helena Brewers players
Wisconsin Timber Rattlers players
Brevard County Manatees players
Biloxi Shuckers players
Surprise Saguaros players
Colorado Springs Sky Sox players
Norfolk Tides players
Salt Lake Bees players
Indianapolis Indians players
Jackson Generals (Southern League) players